The 18th District of the Iowa House of Representatives in the state of Iowa.

Current elected officials
Steven Holt is the representative currently representing the district.

Past representatives
The district has previously been represented by:
 Kenneth D. Scott, 1971–1973
 Harold C. McCormick, 1973–1975
 Terry Dyrland, 1975–1979
 Darrell R. Hanson, 1979–1983
 Richard W. Welden, 1983–1987
 Robert D. Fuller, 1987–1991
 Clark E. McNeal, 1991–1995
 Steven Sukup, 1995–2003
 David Lalk, 2003–2007
 Andrew Wenthe, 2007–2013
 Jason Schultz, 2013–2015
 Steven Holt, 2015–present

References

018